The scapular line, also known as the linea scapularis, is a vertical line passing through the inferior angle of the scapula.

It has been used in the evaluation of brachial plexus birth palsy.

References

External links
 http://www.meddean.luc.edu/Lumen/MedEd/MEDICINE/PULMONAR/apd/lines.htm

Anatomy